Five ships of the Royal Navy have borne the name HMS Bideford, or the archaic variant HMS Biddeford, after the port town of Bideford, Devon. A sixth was planned but never built:

  was a 24-gun sixth rate launched in 1695 and wrecked in 1699.
  was a 20-gun sixth rate launched in 1711. She was rebuilt in 1727, and foundered in 1736.
  was a 24-gun sixth rate launched in 1740 and broken up by 1754.
  was a 20-gun sixth rate launched in 1756 and wrecked in 1761.
 HMS Bideford was to have been a  minesweeper, but was cancelled in 1918.
  was a  sloop launched in 1931 and sold for scrapping in 1949.

Royal Navy ship names